Christopher McQuarrie is an American filmmaker. He received the BAFTA Award, Independent Spirit Award, and Academy Award for Best Original Screenplay for the neo-noir mystery film The Usual Suspects (1995).

He made his directorial debut with the crime thriller film The Way of the Gun (2000). He is a frequent collaborator with Tom Cruise, having written and directed the action films Jack Reacher (2012), Mission: Impossible – Rogue Nation (2015), Mission: Impossible – Fallout (2018), and the upcoming sequels Mission: Impossible – Dead Reckoning Part One (2023) and Mission: Impossible – Dead Reckoning Part Two (2024), in addition to producing the latter three, while also being a part of the writing and/or producing team on the films Valkyrie (2008), Edge of Tomorrow (2014), Jack Reacher: Never Go Back (2016), The Mummy (2017), and Top Gun: Maverick (2022), the latter in which got him a nomination for Academy Award for Best Adapted Screenplay.

Early life
McQuarrie was born in Princeton, New Jersey. After graduating from West Windsor-Plainsboro High School South in 1986, he worked as an assistant at Christ Church Grammar School in Perth, Western Australia, recalling in 2013, “I was offered an Interim program ... I picked a place out of a hat and ended up at Christ Church Grammar School. I lived at the school and worked at the boarding school, though I did very little work". Fired after nine months, "I hitchhiked for three months, came home, knocked around for about a month and then immediately started working for this detective agency.... [It] was actually a glorified security-guard position. I think in the four years I worked there I did about six investigations."

Career
McQuarrie's first feature film was the 1993 thriller Public Access, directed by Bryan Singer. It won the Critics Award at the Deauville American Film Festival and shared the Sundance Film Festival's Grand Jury Prize. It was not released theatrically in the United States. On review aggregator Rotten Tomatoes, it received an approval rating of 58%.

McQuarrie wrote The Usual Suspects (1995), for which he received Best Screenplay awards from the British and American Academy Awards, as well as from Premiere Magazine, the Texas Board of Review, and the Chicago Critics, as well as the Edgar Award and Independent Spirit Award. It was later included on the New York Times list of the 1000 greatest films ever made, and the character Verbal Kint was included on AFI's list of the 100 greatest Heroes and Villains of all time. In 2006, the Writers Guild of America voted The Usual Suspects #35 on their list of 101 Greatest Screenplays. In his third collaboration with Singer, McQuarrie did an extensive rewrite on X-Men, but ultimately removed his name from the project.

In 2000, McQuarrie made his directorial debut with The Way of the Gun, a modern-day Western for which he also wrote the script. It starred Benicio del Toro, Ryan Phillippe and James Caan. The film, budgeted at US$8.5 million, received mixed reviews and grossed US$13 million worldwide.

Eight years later, McQuarrie co-wrote (with Nathan Alexander) and co-produced Valkyrie, which opened on December 25, 2008, and is based on the real-life July 20, 1944, plot to assassinate Adolf Hitler. While researching the screenplay, the writers had access to members of the Stauffenberg family; consulted a book written by Fabian von Schlabrendorff, a conspirator who survived; and spoke with Hitler's surviving bodyguard. The film, starring Tom Cruise and directed by Bryan Singer, received the BMI Film Music Award and the Bambi Award for Courage.  In 2009, McQuarrie was hired to pen the script for the then-untitled The Wolverine.

McQuarrie co-wrote the 2010 film The Tourist with Julian Fellowes, Jeffrey Nachmanoff and director Florian Henckel von Donnersmarck. It starred Johnny Depp and Angelina Jolie and grossed US$278 million worldwide. It received three Golden Globe Award nominations and several other awards, among them the Redbox Movie Award for the most rented drama of 2011.

In 2011, McQuarrie directed his second feature, Jack Reacher, an adaptation of One Shot, the ninth in the series of 21 Jack Reacher novels by Lee Child. Filming began in the Pittsburgh metropolitan area on October 3, 2011, and continued through the end of January 2012. The movie was released in December 2012 by Paramount Pictures. In 2012, McQuarrie stepped in to rewrite the script for World War Z after Drew Goddard and Damon Lindelof left the film.

2013 saw the release of McQuarrie's fourth collaboration with Singer, Jack the Giant Slayer, co-written by McQuarrie. Critical reviews were mixed, and it was a box office failure, grossing only US$198 million against an estimated US$240 million budget (excluding promotion). McQuarrie co-wrote the 2014 science fiction action thriller Edge of Tomorrow with Jez and John-Henry Butterworth, based on the Japanese novel All You Need Is Kill. While the film underperformed at the box office on its opening weekend, earning only US$28.8 million, it received strong reviews and became a word-of-mouth hit, grossing just over US$100 million at the domestic box office.

McQuarrie completed his third feature as director in 2015. Mission: Impossible – Rogue Nation, the fifth entry in the Mission: Impossible film series, which he co-wrote with Drew Pearce. It received strong reviews, grossed over US$195 million at the North American box office, and won a Golden Tomato for Best Action-Adventure Movie of 2015. McQuarrie followed it with Mission: Impossible – Fallout in 2018, his third directing collaboration with Tom Cruise. It received strong reviews from Rotten Tomatoes and other critic websites, became the franchise's highest-grossing title, and won the Critic's Choice award for Best Action Film and a Golden Tomato for Best Action-Adventure Movie of 2018.

By October 2015, McQuarrie completed a rewrite of Rogue One: A Star Wars Story and spent two weeks "tightening up the story". McQuarrie and screenwriter Dylan Kussman were commissioned by Tom Cruise to write a new script for The Mummy. McQuarrie and Cruise collaborated again on Top Gun: Maverick, for which McQuarrie co-wrote the screenplay and produced the film.

Upcoming projects
Initially hesitant to return to the franchise, McQuarrie finalized a deal to write and direct Mission: Impossible – Dead Reckoning Part One and Mission: Impossible – Dead Reckoning Part Two in January 2019, which are scheduled for release on July 14, 2023, and June 28, 2024, respectively.

In February 2011, McQuarrie was hired by Skydance Media to write and produce a feature film adaptation of the 1970s animated television series Star Blazers (itself an adaptation of anime Space Battleship Yamato). In 2013, he was selected to direct the project, with Zach Dean being hired to write a new draft of the script in 2017. McQuarrie has also signed on to direct thrillers Ice Station Zebra, based on the 1963 novel and its 1968 film adaptation, Three to Kill, based on the novel by Jean-Patrick Manchette, and The Chameleon, based on a New Yorker article by David Grann about Frédéric Bourdin.

In August 2022, McQuarrie announced on the Light the Fuse podcast that he was developing a new project with Tom Cruise, to be co-written by Erik Jendresen, which he claimed would be "gnarlier" than the Mission: Impossible films and described as being "something we’ve talked about for a really long time. It’s way outside of what you’re used to seeing Tom do."

Although the Reacher franchise has migrated to TV, McQuarrie and Cruise are continuing to develop a Reacher-like thriller film. This may be the same project as the Jendresen project.

Filmography

Film

Uncredited writing work  
 X-Men (2000)
 Mission: Impossible – Ghost Protocol (2011)
 The Wolverine (2013)
 Rogue One (2016)
 American Made (2017)
 The Unforgivable (2021)

Television

Awards and nominations

Bibliography
McQuarrie, Christopher. The Usual Suspects. Faber and Faber Publishers (1996); /

References

External links
 
 
 
 

Living people
Skydance Media people
20th-century American male writers
20th-century American screenwriters
21st-century American male writers
21st-century American screenwriters
Action film directors
American male screenwriters
American male television writers
American television writers
Best Original Screenplay Academy Award winners
Best Original Screenplay BAFTA Award winners
Edgar Award winners
Film directors from New Jersey
Film producers from New Jersey
People from Princeton, New Jersey
Screenwriters from New Jersey
West Windsor-Plainsboro High School South alumni
Year of birth missing (living people)